Allegations of forced organ harvesting from Falun Gong practitioners and other political prisoners in China have raised concern within the international community. According to a report by former lawmaker David Kilgour, human rights lawyer David Matas and journalist Ethan Gutmann of the Victims of Communism Memorial Foundation, political prisoners, mainly Falun Gong practitioners, are being executed "on demand" in order to provide organs for transplant to recipients. Reports have claimed that organ harvesting has been used to advance the Chinese Communist Party's persecution of Falun Gong and because of the financial incentives available to the institutions and individuals involved in the trade. A report by The Washington Post has disputed some of the allegations, claiming that China does not import sufficient quantities of immunosuppressant drugs, used by transplant recipients, to carry out such quantities of organ harvesting.

Reports on systematic organ harvesting from Falun Gong prisoners first emerged in 2006, though the practice is alleged to have started at least six years earlier. Several researchers—most notably Matas, Kilgour and Gutmann—estimate that tens of thousands of Falun Gong prisoners of conscience have been killed to supply a lucrative trade in human organs and cadavers and that these abuses may be ongoing. These conclusions are based on a combination of statistical analysis; interviews with former prisoners, medical authorities and public security agents; and circumstantial evidence, such as the large number of Falun Gong practitioners detained extrajudicially in China and the profits to be made from selling organs.

The Chinese government long denied all accusations of organ harvesting. The parliaments of Canada and the European Union, as well as the United States House of Representatives, have adopted resolutions condemning the forced organ harvesting from Falun Gong prisoners of conscience. United Nations Special Rapporteurs have called on the Chinese government to account for the sources of organs used in transplant practices, and the World Medical Association, the American Society of Transplantation and the Transplantation Society have called for sanctions on Chinese medical authorities. Several countries have also taken or considered measures to deter their citizens from travelling to China for the purpose of obtaining organs. A documentary on organ harvesting from Falun Gong practitioners, Human Harvest, received a 2014 Peabody Award recognizing excellence in broadcast journalism.

In December 2018, an independent tribunal in London chaired by British barrister Sir Geoffrey Nice concluded "unanimously, and sure beyond reasonable doubt—that in China forced organ harvesting from prisoners of conscience has been practiced for a substantial period of time involving a very substantial number of victims." China eventually admitted that it had engaged in systematic organ harvesting from death row prisoners, though it denies that such an organ harvesting program is ongoing.

Background

Organ transplantation in China

China has one of the largest organ transplant programs in the world. Although China does not keep nationwide statistics on transplant volume, Chinese Communist Party-owned China Daily reported that Chinese officials had estimated that as many as 20,000 organ transplants were performed in 2006. Approximately 9,000 transplants that took place in 2006 were kidney and liver transplants, according to data from the Chinese Ministry of Health. Some sources say the actual number of transplants is significantly higher, based on detailed analysis of hospital records. As a matter of culture and custom, however, China has extremely low rates of voluntary organ donation. Between 2003 and 2009, for instance, only 130 people volunteered to be organ donors. In 2010, the Chinese Red Cross launched a nationwide initiative to attract voluntary organ donors, but only 37 people signed up as of 2011. Due to low levels of voluntary organ donation, most organs used in transplants are sourced from prisoners. The Chinese government approved a regulation in 1984 to allow the removal of organs from executed criminals, provided they give prior consent or if no one claims the body.

Despite the absence of an organized system of organ donation or allocation, wait times for obtaining vital organs in China are among the shortest in the world—often just weeks for organs such as kidneys, livers, and hearts. This has made it a destination for international transplant tourism and a major venue for tests of pharmaceutical anti-rejection drugs. The commercial trade in human organs has also been a lucrative source of revenue for the Chinese medical, military and public security establishments. Because there is no effective nationwide organ donation or allocation system, hospitals source organs from local brokers, including through their connections to courts, detention centers and prisons.

Organ transplant recipients in China are generally not told the identity of the organ donor, nor are they provided with evidence of written consent. In some cases even the identity of the medical staff and surgeons may be withheld from patients. The problem of transparency is compounded by the lack of any ethical guidelines for the transplant profession or system of discipline for surgeons who violate ethical standards.

By the 1990s, growing concerns about possible abuses arising from coerced consent and corruption led medical groups and human rights organizations to start condemning China's use of prisoner organs. These concerns resurfaced in 2001, when a Chinese military doctor testified before U.S. Congress that he had taken part in organ extraction operations from executed prisoners, some of whom were not yet dead. In December 2005, China's Deputy Health Minister Huang Jiefu acknowledged that up to 95% of transplant organs from deceased donors, which make up 65% of all transplantations, came from executed prisoners and promised steps to prevent abuse. Huang reiterated these claims in 2008 and 2010, stating that over 90% of organ transplants from deceased donors are sourced from prisoners. In 2006, the World Medical Association demanded that China cease harvesting organs from prisoners, who are not deemed able to properly consent. In 2014, Huang Jiefu said that reliance on organ harvesting from death row inmates was declining, while simultaneously defending the practice of using prisoners' organs in the transplantation system.

In addition to sourcing organs from death-row inmates, international observers and researchers have also expressed concern that prisoners of conscience are killed to supply the organ transplant industry. These individuals were not convicted of capital crimes, and in many cases were imprisoned extrajudicially on the basis of their political or religious beliefs.

Persecution of Falun Gong

Falun Gong is a Chinese qigong discipline involving meditation and a moral philosophy rooted in Buddhist tradition. The practice rose to popularity in the 1990s in China, and by 1998, Chinese government sources estimated that as many as 70 million people had taken up the practice. Perceiving that Falun Gong was a potential threat to the Party's authority and ideology, Communist Party leader Jiang Zemin initiated a nationwide campaign to eradicate the group in July 1999.

An extra-constitutional body called the 6-10 Office was created to lead the persecution of Falun Gong, and authorities mobilized the state media apparatus, judiciary, police force, army, education system, families, and workplaces to "struggle" against the group.

Since 1999, Falun Gong practitioners have been the targets of systematic torture, mass imprisonment, forced labour, and psychiatric abuse, all with the aim of forcing them to recant their beliefs. As of 2009, the New York Times reported that at least 2,000 Falun Gong practitioners had been killed amid the persecution campaign; Falun Gong sources documented over 3,700 named death cases by 2013. Due to the difficulty in accessing and relaying information from China, however, this may represent only a portion of actual deaths.

Verdicts and reports of organ harvesting from Falun Gong

Sujiatun
The first allegations of large-scale organ harvesting from Falun Gong practitioners were made in March 2006 by three individuals claiming knowledge of involuntary organ extractions at the Sujiatun Thrombosis Hospital in Shenyang, Liaoning province. One of the whistleblowers, the wife of a surgeon at the hospital, claimed her husband had performed numerous operations to remove the corneas of Falun Gong practitioners for transplant.

Representatives of the U.S. State Department were dispatched to the Sujiatun hospital to investigate the claims. They made two visits, first was unannounced and another a tour of the facilities and found no evidence to prove the allegations were true, but said they remained concerned over China's treatment of Falun Gong and the reports of organ harvesting. Soon thereafter, in May 2006, the Coalition to Investigate the Persecution of Falun Gong asked former Canadian parliamentarian David Kilgour and human rights lawyer David Matas to investigate the broader allegations of organ harvesting from Falun Gong practitioners in China. Kilgour and Matas agreed to conduct an investigation as volunteers.

Kilgour-Matas report 

David Kilgour and David Matas released the results of their preliminary investigation on 20 July 2006, in a report titled "Report into Allegations of Organ Harvesting of Falun Gong Practitioners in China". Although the pair were denied visas to travel to China, they nonetheless compiled over 30 distinct strands of evidence which were consistent with allegations of organ harvesting from Falun Gong practitioners. These included an analysis of statistics on organ transplantation in China, interviews with former Falun Gong prisoners, and recorded admissions from Chinese hospitals and law enforcement offices about the availability of Falun Gong practitioners' organs.

In the absence of evidence that would invalidate the organ harvesting allegations—such as a Chinese government registry showing the source of transplant organs—Kilgour and Matas concluded that the Chinese government and its agencies "have put to death a large but unknown number of Falun Gong prisoners of conscience. Their vital organs, including kidneys, livers, corneas and hearts, were seized involuntarily for sale at high prices, sometimes to foreigners, who normally face long waits for voluntary donations of such organs in their home countries." They estimated that from 2000 to 2005, the source for 41,500 organ transplants was unexplained, and that Falun Gong prisoners were the most plausible source for these organs. The authors qualified their report by noting the inherent difficulties in verifying the alleged crimes: no independent organizations are allowed to investigate conditions in China, eyewitness evidence is difficult to obtain, and official information about both organ transplantation and executions is often withheld or is contradictory. The initial report however received a mixed reception. In the US, a Congressional Research Service report by Thomas Lum stated that the Kilgour–Matas report relied largely on logical inference, without bringing forth new or independently obtained testimony; the credibility of much of the key evidence was said to be questionable.

In 2007, Kilgour and Matas presented an updated report under the title "Bloody Harvest: Revised Report into Allegations of Organ Harvesting of Falun Gong Practitioners in China". The findings were subsequently rewritten as a book released in October 2009. The reports received international media coverage, and the authors travelled internationally to present their findings to governments and other concerned organizations.

State Organs: Transplant Abuse in China
In 2012, State Organs: Transplant Abuse in China, edited by Matas and Dr. Torsten Trey, was published with essays from Dr. Gabriel Danovitch, Professor of Medicine, Arthur Caplan, Professor of Bioethics, Dr. Jacob Lavee, cardiothoracic surgeon, Dr. Ghazali Ahmad, Professor Maria Fiatarone Singh, Dr. Torsten Trey, Ethan Gutmann and Matas.

Ethan Gutmann 

Ethan Gutmann, an investigative journalist, author specializing in China, and Research Fellow at the Victims of Communism Memorial Foundation, initiated his own investigation into the allegations of organ harvesting from Falun Gong practitioners in 2006. Over the span of several years, he conducted interviews with over 100 refugees from China's labor camp and prison system, as well as with Chinese law enforcement personnel and medical professionals. Based on his research, Gutmann concluded that organ harvesting from prisoners of conscience became prevalent in the north-western province of Xinjiang during the 1990s, when members of the Uyghur ethnic group were targeted in security crackdowns and "strike hard campaigns." Enver Tohti, an exiled pro-Uyghur independence activist, claims to have carried out the first live organ transplant on a Uyghur Muslim prisoner in 1995. He said that the first time he performed the transplant procedure, he was taken to a room near the execution ground in Urumqi to remove the liver and kidneys of an executed prisoner. He claimed that the man's heart was still beating as he removed the liver and kidneys.

By 1999, Gutmann says that organ harvesting in Xinjiang began to decline precipitously, just as overall rates of organ transplantation nationwide were rising. The same year, the Chinese government launched a nationwide suppression of the Falun Gong spiritual group. Gutmann suggests that the new Falun Gong prisoner population overtook Uyghurs as a major source of organs. He estimated that approximately 65,000 Falun Gong practitioners had been killed for their organs between 2000 and 2008, and notes that this figure is similar to that produced by Kilgour and Matas when adjusted to cover the same time period.

Gutmann has also provided testimony on his findings before U.S. Congress and European Parliament, and in August 2014 published his investigation as a book titled The Slaughter: Mass Killings, Organ Harvesting and China's Secret Solution to Its Dissident Problem.

Verdict by the China Tribunal 
The Independent Tribunal Into Forced Organ Harvesting of Prisoners of Conscience in China, known as the China Tribunal, was initiated in 2018 by the International Coalition to End Transplant Abuse in China. The tribunal, based in London, was made up of a seven-member panel. Geoffrey Nice, a Queen's Counsel and the chair of the tribunal, was a prosecutor at the international criminal tribunal for Yugoslavia. According to an article in the scientific journal Nature, the tribunal does not have any legal authority. The Chinese government declined an invitation to take part in the tribunal.

The tribunal heard evidence over a six-month period. The evidence included analyses of Chinese transplant data, and testimony from ex-prisoners, doctors and human rights workers. Among the 50 witnesses, who testified either in person or via video link, were David Kilgour and Jennifer Zeng. The tribunal also examined reports from the Committee Against Torture, Freedom House and Amnesty International. Other submissions included internal Chinese medical records, previous investigations and academic papers. Covertly recorded phone calls with transplant surgeons and undercover footage inside hospitals were also reviewed.

In June 2019, the tribunal published their final judgment which unanimously concluded that crimes against humanity had been committed. The tribunal's report said "forced organ harvesting has been committed for years throughout China on a significant scale and ... Falun Gong practitioners have been one—and probably the main—source of organ supply." The tribunal estimated between 60,000 and 90,000 transplant operations occurred per year, much more than the official figures of 10,000 from the Chinese government. The chair of the tribunal said "there is no evidence of the practice having been stopped and the tribunal is satisfied that it is continuing."

The tribunal's report included a reference to a research paper, posted on the preprint server SocArXiv, that examined voluntary organ transplant data from 2010 to 2016. That paper was later published in BMC Medical Ethics. The paper's authors said it was difficult to believe the consistent and significant growth in voluntary transplants each year, and they concluded that China's voluntary system probably included non-voluntary donors, likely prisoners. A statistician commissioned by the tribunal reviewed the paper's analysis and agreed that the data on voluntary transplants appeared to be unreliable. Francis L. Delmonico, chair of the World Health Organization's Task Force on Donation and Transplantation of Human Organs and Tissues, told Nature that he was unconvinced by the paper because it did not contain direct evidence of organ harvesting from prisoners.

Evidence
Several distinct strands of evidence have been presented to support allegations that Falun Gong practitioners have been killed for their organs in China. Researchers, human rights advocates and medical advocacy groups have focused in particular on the volume of organ transplants performed in China; the disparity between the number of transplants and known sources of organs; the significant growth in the transplant industry coinciding with the mass imprisonment of Falun Gong practitioners; short wait times that suggest an "on demand" execution schedule; and reports that Falun Gong prisoners are given medical exams in custody to assess their candidacy as organ suppliers.

Increase in nationwide organ transplants after 1999

The number of organ transplants performed in China grew rapidly beginning in 2000. This timeframe corresponds with the onset of the persecution of Falun Gong, when tens of thousands of Falun Gong practitioners were being sent to Chinese labor camps, detention centers and prisons.

In 1998, the country reported 3,596 kidney transplants annually. By 2005, that number had risen to approximately 10,000. The number of facilities performing kidney transplants increased from 106 to 368 between 2001 and 2005. Similarly, according to China Daily, the number of liver transplantation centers in China rose from 22 to over 500 between 1999 and 2006. The volume of transplants performed in these centers also increased substantially in this period. One hospital reported on its website that it performed 9 liver transplants in 1998, but completed 647 liver transplants in four months in 2005. The Jiaotong University Hospital in Shanghai recorded seven liver transplants in 2001, 53 in 2002, 105 in 2003, 144 in 2004, and 147 in 2005.

Kilgour and Matas write that the increase in organ transplants cannot be entirely attributed to improvements in transplant technology: "kidney transplant technology was fully developed in China long before the persecution of Falun Gong began. Yet kidney transplants shot up, more than doubling once the persecution of Falun Gong started...Nowhere have transplants jumped so significantly with the same number of donors simply because of a change in technology."

Furthermore, they note that during this period of rapid expansion in China's organ transplant industry, there were no significant improvements to the voluntary organ donation or allocation system, and the supply of death row inmates as donors also did not increase. Although it does not prove the allegations, the parallel between rapid growth in organ transplants and the mass imprisonment of Falun Gong practitioners is consistent with the hypothesis that Falun Gong practitioners in custody were having their organs harvested.

Discrepancy in known sources of organs
According to a US congressional report in 2005, up to 95% of organ transplants in China are sourced from prisoners. However, China does not perform enough legal executions to account for the large number of transplants that are performed, and voluntary donations are exceedingly rare (only 130 people registered as voluntary organ donors nationwide from 2003 to 2009).

In 2006, the number of individuals sentenced to death and executed was far fewer than the number of transplants. Based on publicly available reports, Amnesty International documented 1,770 executions in 2006; high-end estimates put the figure closer to 8,000. Because China lacks an organized organ matching and allocation system, and in order to satisfy expectations for very short wait times, it is rare that multiple organs are harvested from the same donor. Moreover, many death row inmates have health conditions such as hepatitis B that would frequently disqualify them as organ donors. This suggests the existence of a secondary source for organs.

In a statement before the U.S. House of Representatives, Damon Noto, a spokeman for Doctors Against Forced Organ Harvesting said "the prisoners sentenced to death cannot fully account for all the transplantations that are taking place in China ... Even if they executed 10,000 and transplanted 10,000 a year, there would still be a very large discrepancy. Why is that? It is simply impossible that those 10,000 people executed would match perfectly the 10,000 people that needed the organs." David Kilgour and David Matas similarly wrote that traditional sources of transplants such as executed prisoners, donors, and the brain dead "come nowhere near to explaining the total number of transplants across China."  Like Noto, they point to the large number of Falun Gong practitioners in the labor camp and prison system as a likely alternative source for organs.

Organ transplant wait times

Wait periods for organ transplants in China are significantly shorter than elsewhere in the world. According to a 2006 post on the China International Transplantation Assistance Center website, "it may take only one month to receive a liver transplantation, the maximum waiting time being two months. As for the kidney transplantation, it may take one week to find a suitable donor, the maximum time being one month...If something wrong with the donor's organ happens, the patient will have the option to be offered another organ donor and have the operation again in one week." Other organ transplant centers similarly advertised average wait times of one or two weeks for liver and kidney transplants. This is consistent with accounts of organ transplant recipients, who report receiving organs a matter of days or weeks. By comparison, median wait times for a kidney in developed countries such as the United States, Canada and Great Britain typically range from two years to over four years, despite the fact that these countries have millions of registered organ donors and established systems of organ matching and allocation.

Researchers and medical professionals have expressed concern about the implications of the short organ transplant wait times offered by Chinese hospitals. Specifically, they say these wait times are indicative of a pool of living donors whose organs can be removed on demand. This is because organs must be transplanted immediately after death, or must be taken from a living donor (kidneys must be transplanted within 24–48 hours; livers within 12 hours, and hearts within 8 hours).

Kirk C. Allison, associate director of the Program in Human Rights and Medicine at the University of Minnesota, wrote that the "short time frame of an on-demand system [as in China] requires a large pool of donors pre-typed for blood group and HLA matching," which is consistent with reports of Falun Gong prisoners having blood and tissue tested in custody. He wrote that China's short organ wait times could not be assured on a "random death" basis, and that physicians he queried about the matter indicated that they were selecting live prisoners to ensure quality and compatibility. Dr. Jacob Lavee, Director of the Heart Transplant Unit at the Sheba Medical Center in Israel, recounts one of his patients traveling to China for a heart transplant. The patient waited two weeks for a heart, and the surgery was scheduled in advance—meaning the organ could not have been procured on the basis of a random death. Franz Immer, chairman of the Swiss National Foundation for organ donation and transplantation, reports that during a visit to Beijing in 2007, he was invited by his Chinese hosts to observe a heart transplantation operation: "The organizer asked us whether we would like to have the transplantation operation in the morning or in the afternoon. This means that the donor would die, or be killed, at a given time, at the convenience of the visitors. I refused to participate."

Editors of the Journal of Clinical Investigation write that "The only way to guarantee transplant of a liver or heart during the relatively short time period that a transplant tourist is in China is to quickly obtain the requisite medical information from prospective recipients, find matches among them, and then execute a person who is a suitable match." Noto similarly says that China's organ transplant wait times and the ability to schedule transplants in advance can only be achieved by having a large supply of "living donors that are available on demand." Death row inmates alone are not numerous enough to meet this demand.

Vulnerability of Falun Gong practitioners 

Since 1999, hundreds of thousands of Falun Gong practitioners have been detained in re-education through labor camps, prisons, and other detention facilities in China, making them the largest group of prisoners of conscience in the country. In 2008, the U.S. Department of State cited estimates that half of China's official labor camp population of 250,000 were Falun Gong practitioners, and a 2013 report by Amnesty International found that Falun Gong practitioners comprised between 30 and 100 percent of detainees in the labor camps studied.

Former Chinese prisoners have also reported that Falun Gong practitioners consistently received the "longest sentences and worst treatment" in the camps, and that they are singled out for torture and abuse. In 2006, a study by the UN's Special Rapporteur on Torture noted that 66% of reported cases from China involved Falun Gong victims. Thousands of Falun Gong practitioners have died or been killed in custody, often under disputed circumstances. Family members of the deceased have reported being denied an autopsy; in some instances bodies were summarily cremated without the family's consent. Analysts and rights groups have pointed to several factors that drive the especially severe treatment against Falun Gong practitioners in custody. These include directives issued from central government or Communist Party authorities; incentives and quota systems that encourage abuse; a sense of impunity in the event of deaths in custody; and the effects of the state propaganda that dehumanizes and vilifies Falun Gong practitioners.

The large numbers of Falun Gong prisoners in custody has led researchers to identify them as a likely source for organs. According to Gutmann's research, other marginalized prisoner groups may also have been targeted, including ethnic Tibetans and Uyghurs who reside predominantly in China's western regions. However, for reasons of geographic proximity, Falun Gong practitioners are more likely to be targeted. In addition, because their spiritual practice prohibits smoking or consumption of alcohol, they tend to be comparatively healthy.

In the context of organ harvesting Kilgour and Matas point to a further source of vulnerability. Namely, in order to protect family members from punishment by security agencies, many detained Falun Gong practitioners refuse to give their names or other personally identifying information to police. "Though this refusal to identify themselves was done for protection purposes, it may have had the opposite effect. It is easier to victimize a person whose whereabouts is unknown to family members than a person whose location the family knows," says their report. Kilgour and Matas wrote that they had yet to meet or hear of any Falun Gong practitioners who were safely released from custody after refusing to identify themselves, despite the prevalence of this practice. Similarly, Ethan Gutmann reports that in over a hundred interviews with former prisoners, he encountered only one Falun Gong practitioner who had remained nameless while in custody, and "her organs were even more worn out than my own."

Medical testing in custody 
Ethan Gutmann interviewed dozens of former Chinese prisoners, including sixteen Falun Gong practitioners who recalled undergoing unusual medical tests while in detention. Gutmann says some of these tests were likely routine examinations, and some may have been designed to screen for the SARS virus. However, in several cases, the medical tests described were exclusively aimed at assessing the health of internal organs.

One man, Wang Xiaohua, was imprisoned in a labor camp in Yunnan in 2001 when he and twenty other Falun Gong detainees were taken to a hospital. They had large quantities of blood drawn, in addition to urine samples, abdominal x-rays, and electrocardiogram. Hospital staff did not tend to physical injuries they had suffered in custody. This pattern was repeated in several other interviews. Qu Yangyao, a 30-something Chinese refugee, was taken from a labor camp to a hospital in 2000 along with two other Falun Gong practitioners. She says that hospital staff drew large volumes of blood, conducted chest x-rays and probed the prisoners' organs. There was "no hammer on the knee, no feeling for lymph nodes, no examination of ears or mouth or genitals—the doctor checked her retail organs and nothing else," writes Gutmann.

Another woman, Jung Tian, recounts comprehensive physical exams and the extraction of large volumes of blood—enough for advanced diagnostics or tissue matching—while in a detention center in Shenyang city. At a women's labor camp in Guangdong province, a former detainee says that 180 Falun Gong prisoners were subject to medical tests in early 2003 and that the tests exclusively focused on internal organs. Another female witness who was held at Masanjia Labor Camp in 2005 said that only young, healthy practitioners had comprehensive medical exams upon arrival at the camp; the old and infirm were given only cursory treatment.

In addition to Falun Gong practitioners, researcher Jaya Gibson identified three Tibetan prisoners who were subject to "organs-only" medical exams, all of them shortly after 2005.

Phone call evidence 
In March 2006, immediately after allegations emerged that Falun Gong prisoners were being targeted for organ harvesting, overseas investigators began placing phone calls to Chinese hospitals and police detention centers. The callers posed as prospective transplant recipients or organ brokers and inquired about the availability of Falun Gong organs. In several instances, they obtained recorded admissions that organs could be procured from Falun Gong prisoners. A selection of these conversations were cited as evidence in the report by David Kilgour and David Matas.

In one such call to a police detention center in Mishan city, an official said that they had five to eight Falun Gong practitioners under the age of 40 who were potential organ suppliers. When asked for details on the background of these individuals, the official indicated that they were male Falun Gong prisoners from rural areas.

A doctor at the Minzu hospital in Nanning city said that the hospital did not currently have Falun Gong organs available, but that he had previously selected Falun Gong prisoners for organ harvesting. The doctor also advised the caller to contact a university hospital in neighboring Guangdong province, saying that they had better channels to obtain Falun Gong organs. At the Zhongshan hospital in Shanghai, a doctor told investigators that all his hospital's organs were sourced from Falun Gong practitioners. During an April 2006 phone call to a military hospital in Guangzhou, a doctor told investigators that he had "several batches" of Falun Gong organs, but that the supply could run dry after 20 May 2006. In another call, investigators posed as an organ broker to call the Jinzhou city people's court. In response to a question about obtaining organs from Falun Gong prisoners, a court official said "that depends on your qualifications ... If you have good qualifications, we may still provide some [organs]."

Kilgour and Matas concede that in at least some instances, the hospital staff may have been supplying answers that the callers wanted to hear in order to make a sale. The results of these phone calls would also be difficult to replicate; as allegations of organ harvesting from Falun Gong gained attention, hospitals would become more reluctant to candidly discuss their organ sourcing practices.

This investigative tactic was revived in 2012, when Communist Party officials began investigating Politburo member Bo Xilai for a variety of crimes. Bo had previously been governor of Liaoning province, which researchers believe was a major center for organ harvesting. The "World Organization to Investigate the Persecution of Falun Gong" made phone calls to mid- and high-level officials with prior connections to Bo, posing as members of the internal Communist Party discipline and inspection group that was building the case against him. They asked questions about the chain of command involved in procuring organs from prisoners, including Falun Gong prisoners. When asked about Bo Xilai's involvement in organ harvesting, one high-ranking member of the Politburo reportedly told investigators that Politburo Standing Committee member and security czar Zhou Yongkang "is in charge of this specifically. He knows it."

A city-level official in Liaoning province was asked by investigators what direction Bo Xilai may have given regarding removing organs from Falun Gong prisoners. The official replied "I was asked to take care of this task. Party central is actually taking care of this...He [Bo] was involved quite positively, yeah it seemed quite positive. At that time we mainly talked about it during the meetings within the Standing Committee." The official hung up after realizing that he had not confirmed the identity of the caller.

Commercial incentives
The growth of a commercial organ trade is linked to economic reforms in the late 1980s and early 1990s that saw a steep decline in government funding to the healthcare system. Healthcare moved toward a more market-driven model, and hospitals devised new ways to grow their revenue. This pattern also applies to military hospitals; since the mid-1980s, the People's Liberation Army has engaged in commercial and profit-making ventures to supplement its budget.

In their report on organ harvesting from Falun Gong practitioners, Kilgour and Matas describe transplant hospitals in China that cater to wealthy foreigners who paid upwards of $100,000 for liver, lung, and heart transplants. For instance, the website of the China International Transplantation Network Assistance Center posted the following price list on its website in 2006: Kidney: $62,000; Liver: $98,000–130,000; Liver+kidney: $160,000–180,000; Kidney+pancreas: $150,000; Lung: $150,000–170,000; Heart: $130,000–160,000; Cornea: $30,000. In a statement before the U.S. House of Representatives, Gabriel Danovitch of the UCLA Medical Center said, "The ease in which these organs can be obtained and the manner that they may be allocated to wealthy foreigners has engendered a culture of corruption."

Data on voluntary organ donations
Beginning in 2010, Chinese authorities announced that the country would transition away from the use of prisoners as an organ source, and would rely entirely on voluntary donations coordinated through a centralized registry. By 2015, officials asserted that voluntary donors were the sole source for organ transplants in China. However, critics have pointed to evidence of systematic falsification of data related to voluntary organ donations, casting doubt on reform claims.

In a paper published in the journal BMC Medical Ethics, for instance, researchers analyzed data on voluntary organ transplants from 2010 to 2018. Datasets were drawn from two national sources, several sub-national jurisdictions, and from individual Chinese hospitals. The researchers found compelling evidence of "human-directed data manufacture and manipulation" in the national datasets, as well as "contradictory, implausible, or anomalous data artefacts" in the provincial datasets, which suggests that the data "may have been manipulated to enforce conformity with central quotas." Among the findings was that the purported rate of growth in voluntary donations was derived from a simple quadratic equation, with nearly perfect model parsimony. These findings appear to undermine official claims about the extent of voluntary organ donations in China. The authors of the BMC Medical Ethics article also note that China's model parsimony is one to two orders of magnitude smoother than any other nation's, even those that have experienced rapid growth in their organ transplantation sector.

Case study: Liaoning Province 
In his book on organ transplant abuse, Ethan Gutmann included a case study centered on China's northeastern Liaoning province. Former Politburo member Bo Xilai served as mayor and party chief of Dalian city, Liaoning in the 1990s, and later was made Governor from 2001 to 2004. The province is known to have a high concentration of Falun Gong practitioners, and leads the country in reported Falun Gong deaths in custody. Several observers have noted that Bo Xilai pursued an especially intense campaign against Falun Gong in the province, leading to charges of torture and crimes against humanity.

Bo's close associate Wang Lijun was named head of the Public Security Bureau in Jinzhou, Liaoning, in 2003. In this capacity, he ran an organ transplantation facility where he reportedly oversaw "several thousand" organ transplants, leading to concerns that many of the organs were taken from political prisoners. During a 2006 award ceremony, Wang told reporters "For a veteran policeman, to see someone executed and within minutes to see the transformation in which this person's life was extended in the bodies of several other people—it was soul-stirring."
Gutmann says it is "extremely unlikely" that all the organs used in these operations were taken from executed death-row prisoners, who would not have been plentiful enough to supply thousands of organ transplants. However, Gutmann notes that Liaoning detained large numbers of Falun Gong practitioners in labor camps and prisons. "It is also germane that both Bo Xilai and Wang Lijun built a large measure of their political power on the repression of Falun Gong," he writes.

In addition to organ transplants in Jinzhou, Gutmann notes that security agencies in Dalian city were supplying human cadavers to two major plastination factories, where the bodies are filled with plastics to be sent on display around the world as bodies exhibitions. According to an informant interviewed on the program 20/20, the plastinated cadavers came from executed prisoners. Again, however, Gutmann notes a disparity in the numbers: the body plastination factories operating in Dalian processed thousands of cadavers—far more than could be expected to be donated or taken from legally executed prisoners. The establishment of the body plastination factories coincided with the onset of the persecution of Falun Gong.

Counterarguments
According to a 2017 report from The Washington Post, research and reporting has undercut allegations that China continues to secretly conduct 60,000 to 100,000 organ transplants per year. Data compiled by American company Quintiles IMS showed China's demand for immunosuppressant drugs, which are necessary to prevent the bodies of patients from rejecting transplanted organs, were approximately in line with the number of transplants China said it performed. In 2016, according to health official Huang Jiefu, China performed a total of 13,238 organ transplant operations. Xu Jiapeng, an account manager at Quintiles IMS in Beijing, said it was "unthinkable" China operated a clandestine system that the data on immunosuppressants did not pick up.

Critics have alleged that China's immunosuppressant data would not include foreign transplant tourists but The Washington Post reported that these assertions did not stand up to scrutiny. Jose Nuñez, head of the World Health Organization's transplantation program, said the number of foreigners going to China for transplants in 2015 was "really very low" compared with India, Pakistan, the United States as well as China's past.

Chinese government response
The Chinese government has repeatedly and categorically denied that Falun Gong practitioners have been killed for their organs, and insists that it adheres to World Health Organization standards. Specifically, the government claims that one of the major sources for the transplant figures, Professor Shi Bingyi, later alleged that the Canadian led investigative reports quoting him were fabricated. However, the government has not refuted the specific points of evidence cited by researchers, nor provided an alternative explanation for the source of organs used in transplants.

In response to a 2014 resolution on organ harvesting by the U.S. House of Representatives, a Chinese embassy spokesperson said that China requires written consent from organ donors, and declared that "the so-called organ harvesting from death-row prisoners is totally a lie fabricated by Falun Gong". The embassy representative then urged American lawmakers to stop "supporting and conniving" with Falun Gong.

David Kilgour and David Matas say that the Chinese government's response to their investigation in 2006 contained "a good deal of invective, but no factual information which contradicts or undermines our conclusions or analysis". In particular, the Chinese government response centered on the charge that Falun Gong is an "evil cult"; questioned the motives and independence of the researchers; and noted a captioning error where their report had mislabeled the location of two Chinese cities. The government's response also stated that China prohibits the sale of human organs and requires written consent of the donor—claims which Kilgour and Matas say are belied by the evidence.

From 2006 to 2008, two UN Special Rapporteurs made repeated requests to the Chinese government to respond to allegations about Falun Gong prisoners and explain the source of organs used in transplant operations. The Chinese government's responses did not address these questions or explain the sources of transplant organs. Instead, it wrote China is in compliance with World Health Organization standards, and described the conditions under which organ transplants are permitted under Chinese laws and regulations. It further stated that allegations of organ harvesting "are merely the product of agitation by Falun Gong ... most of them have already been revealed to be unfounded rumours".

The Chinese government also has sought to prevent public discussion of the issue outside its own borders, and has punished Chinese nationals who have spoken on the subject of organ harvesting. In May 2006, European Parliament Vice President Edward McMillan-Scott went to China on a fact-finding mission to investigate human rights violations. His tour guide, Cao Dong, said he knew of organ harvesting and had seen his Falun Gong practitioner friend's cadaver "in the morgue with holes where body parts had been removed". Cao Dong was sentenced to five years in prison for speaking with the European Union official.

In 2007, the Chinese embassy in Canada intervened to cancel the broadcast of a documentary on Falun Gong and organ harvesting, which was scheduled to air on the national broadcast network CBC Television. The same year, the Chinese embassy in Israel tried unsuccessfully to cancel a talk by researcher David Matas on the subject of organ harvesting, threatening that his testimony would have an adverse impact on China–Israel relations.

International response

Medical associations 
Allegations about organ harvesting from Falun Gong led to renewed focus on China's transplant practices by international medical authorities and professional associations. Medical professionals have raised a number of concerns stemming from the use of prisoner organs, and have debated the ethics of conducting exchanges with Chinese transplant hospitals.

In 2006, the World Medical Association adopted a resolution demanding that China stop using prisoners as organ donors.

Since 2011, several medical journals have declared that they would cease publishing articles related to organ transplantation operations in China due to concerns about violations of medical ethics. The Journal of Clinical Investigation, a prestigious publication on biomedical research, declared that China's use of organs from executed prisoners "violates basic human rights. It violates core ethical precepts of transplant medicine and medical ethics. Worse still, some of those who are killed may be prisoners whose 'crimes' involve no more than holding certain political or spiritual beliefs." The journal decided that it would no longer accept manuscripts on human organ transplantation "unless appropriate non-coerced consent of the donor is provided and substantiated". A similar opinion was expressed by authors in the American Journal of Transplantation.

Writing in The Lancet in 2011, a group of prominent American surgeons and bioethicists called for a boycott of Chinese science and medicine pertaining to organ transplantation. "It is clear from the numbers provided by China that not all of the organs for Chinese citizens and transplant tourists are provided by voluntary consenting donors. The source of many of these organs is executed prisoners whose consent is either non-existent or ethically invalid and whose demise might be timed for the convenience of the waiting recipient", they wrote. The article's lead author, Dr. Arthur Caplan, later added "Killing prisoners for their parts is unethical on its own", but the practice is even more heinous given that some of the executed prisoners were imprisoned for religious or political beliefs.

In contrast, Jeremy Chapman, Australian transplantation surgeon, dismissed Kilgour and Matas's report as "pure imagination piled upon political interest".

United Nations Special Rapporteurs 
From 2006 to 2008, two UN Special Rapporteurs made repeated requests to the Chinese government to respond to allegations about Falun Gong prisoners and explain the source of organs used in transplant operations. In a February 2008 report, UN Special Rapporteur on Torture Manfred Nowak noted that in China "there are many more organ transplants than identifiable sources of organs ... It is alleged that the discrepancy between available organs and numbers from identifiable sources is explained by organs harvested from Falun Gong practitioners, and that the rise in transplants from 2000 coincides and correlates with the beginning of the persecution of these persons". The Chinese government's responses did not address these questions or explain the sources of transplant organs.

Responses from other governments 
Several national governments have held hearings in their national legislatures regarding organ harvesting from Falun Gong practitioners, with some of them subsequently adopting resolutions condemning organ transplant abuses in China or developing legislation to ban transplant tourism.

United States 

In July 2014, the Foreign Affairs Subcommittee of the U.S. House of Representatives unanimously adopted a resolution condemning state-sanctioned organ harvesting from Falun Gong prisoners of conscience and members of other minority groups. The allegations have also surfaced in reports by the Congressional-Executive Commission on China, and in the Department of State Country Report on Human Rights for China for 2011. In January 2015, the White House responded to a petition signed by 34,000 Americans condemning organ harvesting from Falun Gong prisoners. The response noted that:"China's leaders have announced a pledge to abolish the practice of taking human organs for transplant from executed prisoners, although we are aware of continued reports of such practices. We take such allegations very seriously and will continue to monitor the situation."

European Union
The European Parliament heard testimony about organ harvesting in China during a 6 December 2012 session on human rights in China. One year later, it passed a resolution expressing "deep concern over the persistent and credible reports of systematic, state-sanctioned organ harvesting from non-consenting prisoners of conscience in the People's Republic of China, including from large numbers of Falun Gong practitioners imprisoned for their religious beliefs, as well as from members of other religious and ethnic minority groups." The resolution called for the immediate release of all prisoners of conscience, and urged Chinese authorities to respond to United Nations inquiries about the source of organs used in transplants. In March 2014, the European Economic and Social Committee in Brussels convened a follow-up event on organ transplant abuses in China. Participants and speakers at the session endorsed the recommendations of the parliamentary resolution, which recognized that Falun Gong and other minority groups are targets of forced organ harvesting in China. EESC President Henri Malosse called for greater pressure to be put on the Chinese government to end organ transplant abuses.

Italy
In March 2014, the members of the Italian commission on human rights unanimously adopted a resolution calling for the immediate release of Falun Gong practitioners and other prisoners of conscience in China, and urging Italian hospitals to reconsider collaborations with China in the area of organ transplants. In 2015, the Italian Senate adopted a bill which makes it a crime to traffic in organs from living donors. Individuals found guilty of this offence could face 3–12 years in prison and fines of up to 300,000 Euros (US$350,000).

Australia
In December 2006, the Australian Ministry of Health revealed that two of the country's major organ transplant hospitals had banned training of Chinese surgeons, in response to concerns about organ harvesting from Falun Gong practitioners and other prisoners. On 21 March 2013, the Australian Senate unanimously passed a motion concerning reports of organ harvesting in China. The motion, which was introduced one day after a parliamentary briefing on the subject of organ harvesting from Falun Gong prisoners, called on Australia to adopt strict standards to address the practice of international organ trafficking. The same year, Green party lawmakers in New South Wales, Australia, proposed legislation to criminalize and create specific offenses related to trafficking in human organs and tissue. 

In 2018, Graham Fletcher, the head of the Department of Foreign Affairs and Trade's North Asia Division, said "the idea that there is a separate, parallel, hidden, vast network of unspeakable activity where people are essentially killed for their organs, we don't believe that that is happening." Graham's statement was to a parliamentary inquiry into organ trading.

Israel
In 2007, Israel's national legislative body the Knesset adopted new legislation barring insurance companies from providing coverage to Israeli citizens who travel abroad to purchase organs. The move was partly a response to an investigation in which Israeli authorities arrested several men involved in mediating transplants of Chinese prisoners' organs for Israelis. One of the men had stated in an undercover interview that the organs came from "people who oppose the regime, those sentenced to death and from prisoners of the Falun Gong." In addition to prohibiting citizens from buying organs overseas, the law also imposed criminal charges on organ traffickers. The new rules resulted in a significant decrease in the number of Israeli citizens seeking transplants abroad, while also helping to catalyze an expansion of the voluntary donor registry domestically.

Spain
In 2010, Spain implemented a law prohibiting its nationals from traveling abroad to obtain illegal organ transplants. The legislation was proposed after a Spanish citizen reportedly traveled to Tianjin, China, where he obtained a liver for US$130,000 after waiting for just 20 days. The Spanish legislation makes it a crime to promote or facilitate an illegal organ transplant, punishable with up to 12 years in prison. In addition, any organization found to have participated in illegal organ transplant transactions will be subject to a fine.

Taiwan 
In June 2015, the national legislature of Taiwan passed an amendment to the "Human Organ Transplantation Act" to prohibit the sale or purchase of organs, including from abroad. The law also prohibits the use of organs from executed prisoners. Legislators who supported the bill noted that the amendments were intended to address the problem of Taiwanese citizens traveling to China to purchase organs, some of which were harvested from living donors.

Canada and France 
Similar bills against organ tourism have been proposed in the French national assembly (2010) and in Canadian parliament (2007, 2013).

On 10 December 2018, the S-240 bill – An Act to amend the Criminal Code and the Immigration and Refugee Protection Act (trafficking in human organs), was read the second time in House of Commons of Canada and referred to Canadian House of Commons Standing Committee on Foreign Affairs and International Development. In the debate, Vice-chair of Foreign Affairs and International Development Subcommittee on International Human Rights (SDIR) MP Ms. Cheryl Hardcastle stated that: "...the numbers may actually be between 60,000 and 100,000 organ transplants per year... The principal victims of China's organ-harvesting industry was the country's Falun Gong followers... China's organ-harvesting industry developed in tandem with its systematic repression of Falun Gong... Today ... is a profound anniversary marking the UN Convention on the Prevention and Punishment of the Crime of Genocide and Universal Declaration of Human Rights 70 years ago. Those sentiments are inextricably linked after the horrors witnessed in World War II and the conviction of never again. I submit that those sentiments are profoundly linked here as well to Bill S-240. After World War II, the world sought to ensure such madness ensued against humanity never happened again. Organ harvesting and trafficking are a nauseating reality and we must put a stop to them. Canada must act and must start by passing Bill S-240."The bill did not pass into law during the 42nd Parliament however it has been reconsidered in the 43rd as S-204 and in the 44th Parliament as S-223. , it is being considered in the House by the Standing Committee on Foreign Affairs and International Development.

See also 
 Antireligious campaigns in China
 Chinese body dissection exhibition
 Chris Smith
 Dana Rohrabacher
 Gunther von Hagens
 Organ donation in the United States prison population
 Organ transplantation in China

References

External links 
 China Tribunal: Independent Tribunal into Forced Organ Harvesting from Prisoners of Conscience in China
 
 International Coalition to End Transplant Abuse in China - advocacy group that documents and opposes organ harvesting in China

Falun Gong
Organ trade
Organ transplantation
Communist repression
Political repression in China
Genocides in Asia
Human rights abuses in China